The following are the Pulitzer Prizes for 1939

Journalism awards
 Public Service:
 Miami Daily News for its campaign for the recall of the Miami City Commission.
 Honorable mention to the Waterbury Republican (Connecticut) for "exposure of municipal graft".
 Reporting:
 Thomas Lunsford Stokes of the Scripps-Howard Newspaper Alliance for his series of articles on alleged intimidation of workers for the Works Progress Administration in Pennsylvania and Kentucky during an election. The articles were published in The New York World-Telegram.
 Correspondence:
 Louis P. Lochner of the Associated Press for his dispatches from Berlin.
 Editorial Writing:
 Ronald G. Callvert of The Oregonian (Portland, Oregon) for his distinguished editorial writing during the year as exemplified by the editorial entitled "My Country 'Tis of Thee".

 Editorial Cartooning:
 Charles G. Werner of the Daily Oklahoman for "Nomination for 1938".

Letters and Drama Awards
 Novel:
The Yearling by Marjorie Kinnan Rawlings (Scribner).
 Drama:
 Abe Lincoln in Illinois by Robert E. Sherwood (Scribner).
 History:
 A History of American Magazines by Frank Luther Mott (Harvard Univ. Press).
 Biography or Autobiography:
 Benjamin Franklin by Carl Van Doren (Viking).
 Poetry:
 Selected Poems by John Gould Fletcher (Farrar).

References

External links
Pulitzer Prizes for 1939

Pulitzer Prizes by year
Pulitzer Prize
Pulitzer Prize